Accra rubrothicta is a species of moth of the family Tortricidae. It is found in Nigeria.

The wingspan is about 12 mm. The forewings are grey and the costa is whitish, mixed with orange and pink towards the inner wing surface. The termen is whitish suffused with pink and indistinctly spotted with grey. The hindwings are grey.

References

Endemic fauna of Nigeria
Moths described in 1986
Tortricini
Moths of Africa